The fine-lined tree frog (Boana leptolineata) is a species of frog in the family Hylidae endemic to Brazil. Its natural habitats are moist savanna, rivers, freshwater marshes, and intermittent freshwater marshes.

References

Boana
Endemic fauna of Brazil
Amphibians described in 1977
Taxonomy articles created by Polbot